Alex Evans may refer to:

Alex Evans (baseball) (born 1897), American Negro league baseball player
Alex Evans (cricketer) (born 2000), English cricketer
Alex Evans (footballer) (born 1991), Welsh footballer
Alex Evans (rugby union), Australian rugby union coach
Alex Evans (video game developer), English video game developer and co-founder of Media Molecule
Alex Evans (model) (born 1989), British fashion model and winner of Britain's Next Top Model, Cycle 4
Alex Evans (cyclist) (born 1997), Australian road cyclist
Alex Evans, bass guitarist and songwriter with top 20 band Moke (British band)

See also
Alexander Evans (disambiguation)